Givira ethela is a moth in the family Cossidae. It is found in North America, where it has been recorded from Arizona, California and Nevada.

Adults have been recorded on wing from July to August.

References

Natural History Museum Lepidoptera generic names catalog

Givira
Moths described in 1893